Irit Dinur (Hebrew: אירית דינור) is an Israeli mathematician. She is professor of computer science at the Weizmann Institute of Science.  Her research is in foundations of computer science and in combinatorics, and especially in probabilistically checkable proofs and hardness of approximation.

Biography
Irit Dinur earned her doctorate in 2002 from the school of computer science in Tel Aviv University, advised by Shmuel Safra; her thesis was entitled On the Hardness of Approximating the Minimum Vertex Cover and The Closest Vector in a Lattice. She joined the Weizmann Institute after visiting the Institute for Advanced Study in Princeton, New Jersey, NEC, and the University of California, Berkeley.

Dinur published in 2006 a new proof of the PCP theorem that was significantly simpler than previous proofs of the same result.

Awards and recognition
In 2007, she was given the Michael Bruno Memorial Award in Computer Science by Yad Hanadiv. She was a plenary speaker at the 2010 International Congress of Mathematicians. In 2012, she won the Anna and Lajos Erdős Prize in Mathematics, given by the Israel Mathematical Union. She was the William Bentinck-Smith Fellow at Harvard University in 2012–2013. In 2019, she won the Gödel Prize for her paper "The PCP theorem by gap amplification".

References

External links 
 Personal HomePage
 Turing Centennial Post 1: Irit Dinur, guest post on Luca Trevisan's blog "in theory" concerning Dinur's experiences as a lesbian academic

Academic staff of Weizmann Institute of Science
Living people
Tel Aviv University alumni
21st-century  Israeli mathematicians
21st-century women mathematicians
Year of birth missing (living people)
Gödel Prize laureates
Erdős Prize recipients